Martin John Robinson (born 12 September 1962) is a former English first-class cricketer.

Born at Tholthorpe, Robinson played second XI cricket for Gloucestershire and Leicestershire in the mid-1980s, but was unable to force his way into either county's first XI. He would go onto play first-class cricket for the Marylebone Cricket Club, debuting in 1988 against M Parkinson's World XI at Scarborough. He played again in the same fixture the following year. Robinson scored a total of 20 runs in his two first-class appearances. He later played second XI cricket for Durham, but again was unable to force his way into their starting XI.

References

External links

1962 births
Living people
People from Hambleton District
English cricketers
Marylebone Cricket Club cricketers